"Som om himlen brann" is a song performed by Lizette Pålsson & Bizazz in Melodifestivalen 1992, finishing in second place. The song charted at Svensktoppen for five weeks between 19 April – 17 May 1992, peaking at No. 4.

References

1992 singles
Eagle Records singles
Melodifestivalen songs of 1992
Swedish-language songs
1992 songs